Hans Peters is a millionaire.

Hans Peters may also refer to:

Hans Peters (art director)
Hans Peters (SPD), see Europa-Union Deutschland
Hans Peters (artist), see Carl Georg Heise
Hans Peters (politician), see List of members of the European Parliament for West Germany, 1984–89
Hans Peters, see Kreisau Circle#Catholic members